Jorge Riveros (Ocaña, 10 November 1934) is a Colombian painter, sculptor and illustrator.

His art evolved over the course of his professional career, achieving an important aspect in his works: significance.

Early work
Riveros moved to Bogotá in 1948, and began to work as an illustrator in 1950 for the periodicals "El Liberal" and "El Diario Gráfico," and for Cromos magazine.

He studied at the Escuela Nacional de Bellas Artes from 1951 to 1956, graduating with the titles of Master in Painting and Professor of Drawing. From then on, he taught at several different drawing schools.

It was the year 1960 when he had his first solo exhibition of figurative impressionism, a trend that, following that year, he dedicated to avant-garde constructivist geometry.

Europe 

The first award given to Master Jorge Riveros was from the Salon of Artists from Santander in 1964. That same year he traveled to Europe to take a course on the History of Art at the Instituto de Cultura Hispánica and to specialize in Mural Painting at the Escuela de Bellas Artes in Madrid, Spain. One year later, in 1965, he moved to Germany and was involved in several individual and group exhibitions in different cities of that country.

In 1969 he began to experiment with geometric abstraction and came to form a part of the "Semikolon" group of artists, holding numerous exhibitions with that association. That year he also became a member of the Art Association for Rhineland and Westphalia in Düsseldorf. Riveros was issued an invitation in 1971 to form a part of the International Organization of Constructivist Painters, "Circle of Constructivist Work," headquartered in the city of Bonn.

Colombia 
In 1975, Riveros decided to return to Colombia. He received an appointment as a professor in the Fine Arts Department at Universidad Nacional de Colombia; the main courses he taught were Still Life, Portraiture, Nudes, and Landscapes until 1999. By 1977, he was also a professor of drawing and painting at Universidad Jorge Tadeo Lozano and Universidad de La Sabana.

His painting moved toward Constructivism with clear pre-Columbian influences at the beginning of the 80s and for approximately two decades, displaying more intense and varied colors. 
In 1983 he participated as a judge and a special guest in the first Visual Arts Salon in Cúcuta, and the following year, the government of Argentina invited him to represent Colombian art at the National Art Fund in his capacity as a painter and a Fine Arts professor at Universidad Nacional de Colombia.

In 1986 he became a founding member of the Museo Bolivariano de Arte in Santa Marta, Colombia. Four years later, in 1990, he traveled to Germany to study, and participated in an auction of Latin American Art at Christie's New York.

Riveros experimented with large-format murals in 1996.

In 1999 he concluded his teaching career, and published the book "Jorge Riveros" written by Francisco Gil Tovar and Víctor Guédez. That same year, the Governor of Norte de Santander decreed that the life and work of Jorge Riveros would be included in school curriculum.

Riveros has participated in art fairs such as ARTFI in Santo Domingo and ARTBO in Bogotá. Throughout his career, he has also worked in metal sculpture and has undertaken several projects for public spaces in Bogotá. In 2010 he developed plans for urban fixtures and installations.

Revisiting his work developed in Germany during the 60s and 70s in geometric abstraction, as of 1996 Riveros has completed several works using his ideas and concepts from that era.

On 20 July 2014, in celebration of the Independence of Colombia, the artist drew Google's commemorative Doodle for that day. .

He currently lives and works in Bogotá.

Solo art shows

Group exhibitions

References

1934 births
20th-century Colombian painters
20th-century Colombian male artists
Living people
Modern painters
Modern sculptors
20th-century Colombian sculptors
Academic staff of the National University of Colombia
Academic staff of the University of La Sabana
21st-century painters
21st-century sculptors
Male sculptors
People from Norte de Santander Department
Colombian male painters
Academic staff of Jorge Tadeo Lozano University